This is a list of properties and districts in Butts County, Georgia that are listed on the National Register of Historic Places (NRHP).

Current listings

|}

References

Butts
Butts County, Georgia
National Register of Historic Places in Butts County, Georgia